Joseph "Joe" Eubanks (August 9, 1925 – June 21, 1971) was a NASCAR Grand National driver from Spartanburg, South Carolina, USA. He entered the United States Armed Forces along with fellow NASCAR veterans Bud Moore and Cotton Owens. All three of these men served in World War II together.

Career summary
Eubanks raced from 1950 to 1961 collecting one win, thirty-seven finishes in the top five, and eighty-one finishes in the top ten along the way. His total career earnings were $35,338 ($ when adjusted for inflation) and he successfully completed  of racing.

As one of the first competitors to compete in a NASCAR road racing event, Eubanks finished second to Al Keller who was driving a 1951 Hudson Hornet automobile. Joe was a competitor for the 1955 Southern 500 and was credited for having the fastest Oldsmobile 88 vehicle of that particular race. Dirt tracks were Eubanks' greatest strong point as a driver; where a "top ten" finish were frequent. Superspeedway tracks turned out to be his weakness as his average finish on those tracks was 38th place.

Eubanks' primary vehicle was the #88 Ford machine owned by Don Every and Domenic Petti of Daytona Florida. He was also one of the extras for the 1960 stock car racing film Thunder in Carolina.

References

1925 births
1971 deaths
United States Army personnel of World War II
NASCAR drivers
Sportspeople from Spartanburg, South Carolina
Racing drivers from South Carolina